The 1994 Ju-Jitsu World Championship were the 1st edition of the Ju-Jitsu World Championships, and were held in Cento, Italy from November 25 to November 27, 1994.

European Ju-Jitsu

Fighting System

Men's events

Women's events

Duo System

Duo Classic events

References